Mark Alan Dacascos (born February 26, 1964) is an American actor and martial artist. He won numerous karate and kung fu championships between the ages of 7 and 18. He is known for his roles as Wo Fat in Hawaii Five-0, Louis Stevens in Only the Strong, Mani in Brotherhood of the Wolf, Toby Wong in Drive, Ling in Cradle 2 the Grave, the titular role in Crying Freeman and Zero in John Wick: Chapter 3 – Parabellum.

Perhaps best known as "The Chairman" on Food Network's Iron Chef America series since January 2005, he has continued the role as of 2022 on Netflix's Iron Chef: Quest for an Iron Legend. His other roles include Kung Lao in the web series Mortal Kombat: Legacy, Eric Draven in The Crow: Stairway to Heaven and Eubulon in Kamen Rider: Dragon Knight. He also competed in the ninth season of Dancing with the Stars.

Early life
Dacascos was born February 26, 1964, in Oahu, Hawaii. His father, Al Dacascos, is from Hawaii and is a martial arts instructor whose parents originated from the Philippines and were of Chinese, Filipino and Spanish ancestry. His biological mother, Moriko McVey-Murray, is of Irish and Japanese ancestry. In the History Channel presentation Samurai, Dacascos revealed that many members of his mother's family were killed in the bombing of Hiroshima. His stepmother is award-winning martial artist Malia Bernal. He attended Los Angeles Valley College, where he was on the gymnastics team. He also attended Portland State University in Portland, Oregon. He is proficient in his father's style of martial arts, Wun Hop Kuen Do. He has studied Muay Thai, capoeira with Amen Santo, and Wushu.

Career

Dacascos became an actor after being discovered walking down the street in San Francisco's Chinatown by Chris Lee (assistant director) and Rexall Chinn (hairstylist), who at the time were working for director Wayne Wang. He was cast in Dim Sum: A Little Bit of Heart, and though his scenes were cut from the final film, he went on to establish a film and television career primarily playing martial artists.  He was originally set to play as the Red Ranger, Victor Lee, in Bio-Man, an adaptation of Choudenshi Bioman produced by Haim Saban. The show was not picked up at the time but the concept evolved into Mighty Morphin Power Rangers.

His breakout role was in the 1993 film Only the Strong, in which he played Louis, a capoeira master who takes a high school's potential failures and turns their lives around by teaching them the Brazilian martial art based on the Angolan ritual combat technique of Engola. In the following year, Dacascos co-starred with Party of Fives Scott Wolf as Jimmy and Billy Lee, respectively, in the film Double Dragon, based on the video game with the same name.

He plays the role of the Chairman of Iron Chef America, Iron Chef Australia and Iron Chef Mexico. In the series' backstory he is the nephew of the original Iron Chef Chairman, Takeshi Kaga.

He has been featured in many action films such as Drive, Brotherhood of the Wolf, Crying Freeman and Cradle 2 the Grave, in which he squared off against Jet Li. He also performed in three video games: voice acting in Stranglehold, live acting in Wing Commander IV: The Price of Freedom and digitally recreating The Chairman in the Iron Chef America: Supreme Cuisine video game for Wii.

Dacascos was nominated for the Saturn Award for Best Supporting Actor in 2002 for his role in Brotherhood of the Wolf. He also appeared in the television series The Crow: Stairway to Heaven, which was a follow-up to the 1994 film The Crow. He also appears in the children's television show Kamen Rider: Dragon Knight, where he portrays Eubulon, also known as the Advent Master, mentor of the Kamen Riders and creator of the Advent Decks.

Dacascos played the recurring role of Wo Fat on the CBS series Hawaii Five-0. He portrayed Kung Lao in the second season of the YouTube series Mortal Kombat: Legacy. He had a recurring role in the third season of Agents of S.H.I.E.L.D. as Mr. Giyera, an Inhuman servant of Hydra who can manipulate inanimate objects.

In May 2019, Dacascos played Zero, a lead antagonist in the action thriller film John Wick: Chapter 3 – Parabellum. He starred in a recurring role on the Netflix series Wu Assassins. He has reprised his role as The Chairman of the Iron Chef series in Iron Chef: Quest for an Iron Legend, which was released on Netflix in June 2022.

Personal life
Dacascos is married to actress Julie Condra, who starred with him in Crying Freeman. They have three children: two sons and a daughter.

Filmography

Film

Television

Web

Awards

References

External links

 
 HILuxury article on Mark Dacascos

1964 births
Living people
American people of Irish descent
American male actors of Japanese descent
American male actors of Chinese descent
American male film actors
American film actors of Asian descent
American television actors
American male voice actors
American capoeira practitioners
American Muay Thai practitioners
American wushu practitioners
American people of Spanish descent
American male actors of Filipino descent
Participants in American reality television series
Portland State University alumni
20th-century American male actors
21st-century American male actors